Franklin Upshur (November 27, 1875 – August 16, 1965) was an American politician and lawyer. He served in the Maryland House of Delegates in 1924 and as state's attorney of Worcester County, Maryland from 1947 to 1951.

Early life
Franklin Upshur was born on November 27, 1875, in Snow Hill, Maryland to Emma (née Franklin) and George M. Upshur. His grandfather was John Rankin Franklin. He graduated from Princeton University in 1897 and he graduated from the University of Maryland School of Law in 1899.

Career
Around 1900, Upshur became an assistant state's attorney in Baltimore. By 1909, he was practicing law with his father in Snow Hill under the law firm Upshur and Upshur.

Upshur was a Democrat. Upshur served in the Maryland House of Delegates in 1924. In 1933, Upshur worked for the Worcester County Public Schools. In 1926, Upshur ran against Thomas Alan Goldsborough for a seat in the United States House of Representatives. He ran to modify or repeal the Volstead Act and advocated for a tariff on tomatoes. Goldsborough defeated Upshur in the Democratic primary.

Upshur served as state's attorney in Worcester County, Maryland from 1947 to 1951.

Personal life
Upshur married Ethelyn Wilson, daughter of Ephraim King Wilson II, of Baltimore on June 23, 1909. She died in 1957. He had one daughter, Ann.

Upshur died on August 16, 1965, at Spring Hill Sanitarium in Salisbury, Maryland. He was buried at Makemie Memorial Presbyterian Church in Snow Hill.

References

External links

1875 births
1965 deaths
Princeton University alumni
University of Maryland Francis King Carey School of Law alumni
People from Snow Hill, Maryland
19th-century American lawyers
20th-century American lawyers
Democratic Party members of the Maryland House of Delegates
State's attorneys in Maryland